Robert Stevens (1777 – 3 February 1870) was an English first-class cricketer active 1797 to 1799 who played for Marylebone Cricket Club (MCC). He was born in Botesdale, Suffolk and died in Rochester.

References

1777 births
1870 deaths
English cricketers
Marylebone Cricket Club cricketers
Non-international England cricketers
Lord Yarmouth's XI cricketers
People educated at Westminster School, London